İmanlar or Imanlar may refer to:

İmanlar, Lachin, a village in the Lachin District of Azerbaijan
İmanlar, Shusha, a village in the Shusha District of Azerbaijan